Etta Place (?) was a companion of the American outlaws Robert LeRoy Parker, alias Butch Cassidy and Harry Alonzo Longabaugh, alias Sundance Kid. The three were members of the outlaw gang known as Butch Cassidy's Wild Bunch. She was principally the companion of Longabaugh. Little is known about her; both her origin and her fate remain unknown.

Life with Sundance Kid
According to a memorandum from the Pinkerton Detective Agency, dated July 29, 1902, she was "said ... to be from Texas", and in another Pinkerton document dated 1906, she is described as being, "27 to 28 years old", placing her birth in 1877, 1878 or 1879. A hospital staff record from Denver, where she received treatment in May 1900, reports her age as "22 or 23", putting her birth year at 1877 or 1878.

Like Etta Place’s history, her name is somewhat ambiguous. "Place" was the maiden surname of Longabaugh's mother (Annie Place), and she is recorded in various sources as Mrs. Harry Longabaugh or Mrs. Harry A. Place. In the one instance where she is known to have signed her name, she did so as "Mrs. Ethel Place". The Pinkertons called her "Ethel", "Ethal", "Eva", and "Rita" before finally settling on "Etta" for its wanted posters. Her name may have become "Etta" after she moved to South America, where Spanish speakers had trouble pronouncing "Ethel".

In February 1901, Etta Place accompanied Longabaugh to New York City, where at Tiffany's jewelers they purchased a lapel watch and stickpin, and posed for the now-famous DeYoung portrait at a studio in Union Square on Broadway. It is one of only two known images of her. On February 20, 1901, she sailed with Longabaugh and Parker (who was now posing as "James Ryan," her fictional brother), aboard the British ship Herminius for Buenos Aires.

There, she settled with the two outlaws on a ranch  they had purchased near Cholila in the Chubut Province of southwest Argentina, living in a four-room log cabin on the east bank of the Blanco River. Under a new 1884 law, they were granted 15,000 acres (61 km²) of adjacent land to develop, 2,500 of which belonged to Place, who has the distinction of being the first woman in Argentina to acquire land under the new act, as land ownership had previously been denied to women.

On March 3, 1902,  she returned with Longabaugh to New York City on the SS Soldier Prince, probably to visit family and friends in the United States. On April 2, they registered at a Mrs. Thompson's rooming house in New York City. They toured Coney Island and visited his family (originally from Mont Clare, Pennsylvania, but by then living in Atlantic City, New Jersey). They also possibly traveled to a Dr. Pierce's Invalid Hotel in Buffalo, New York, for unspecified medical treatment. They then traveled west, where again they sought medical treatment, this time in Denver, Colorado. They returned to Buenos Aires from New York on July 10, 1902, aboard the steamer Honorius, posing as stewards. On August 9, she was with Longabaugh at the Hotel Europa in Buenos Aires, and on the 15th, she sailed with him aboard the steamer SS Chubut to return to their ranch.

In the summer of 1904, she made another visit with Longabaugh to the United States, where the Pinkerton Detective Agency traced them to Fort Worth, Texas, and to the St. Louis World Fair, but failed to arrest them before they returned to Argentina. In early 1905, the trio sold the Cholila ranch, as once again the law was beginning to catch up with them. The Pinkerton Agency had known their precise address for months, but the rainy season prevented their assigned agent, Frank Dimaio, from traveling there and making an arrest. Governor Julio Lezana issued an arrest warrant, but before it could be executed, Sheriff Edward Humphreys, a Welsh Argentinian who was friendly with Parker and enamored of Place, tipped them off. The trio fled north to San Carlos de Bariloche, where they embarked on the steamer Condor across Lake Nahuel Huapi and into Chile.

By the end of that year, however, they were back in Argentina. On December 19, 1904, Place took part, along with Longabaugh, Parker, and an unknown male, in the robbery of the Banco de la Nacion in Villa Mercedes, 400 miles west of Buenos Aires. Pursued by armed lawmen, they crossed the Pampas and the Andes and again into Chile.

Place had long been tired of life on the run, and deeply lamented the loss of their ranch. At her request, on June 30, 1906, Longabaugh accompanied her from Valparaiso, Chile, to San Francisco, where she apparently remained, while he returned permanently to South America. After that parting, there is no evidence that Longabaugh and Place ever saw one another again.

Mysteries
Those who had met Place claimed the first thing they noticed about her was that she was strikingly pretty, with a very nice smile, and that she was cordial, articulate, refined in speech and manners, and an excellent shot with a rifle. She was said to have spoken in an educated manner, and she indicated she was originally from the East Coast, although she never revealed an exact location.

Years later, eyewitnesses said that Place was one of only five women known to have been allowed into the Wild Bunch hideout at Robbers Roost in southern Utah, the other four having been Will Carver's girlfriend Josie Bassett, who also was involved with Parker for a time; Josie's sister and Parker's longtime girlfriend Ann Bassett; Elzy Lay's girlfriend Maude Davis; and gang member Laura Bullion.
Place was believed to have once been married to a schoolteacher, and at least one person claimed Place herself was a teacher who abandoned her husband and two children to be with Longabaugh. It has also been speculated that she met the gang while working as a prostitute and was originally Parker's lover, and became involved with Longabaugh later, but no direct evidence of this has been found.
She may have met Parker and/or Longabaugh in the brothel of Madame Fannie Porter in San Antonio, which was frequented by members of the Wild Bunch gang.  Several gang members met girlfriends at Madame Porter's, who later traveled with them, including Kid Curry and Della Moore, a prostitute, and Will Carver and Lillie Davis. Wild Bunch female gang member Laura Bullion is believed to have worked at the brothel from time to time.

Identity theories

Ethel Bishop
Place's real name has been suggested to be Ethel Bishop. Such a woman lived at another brothel, at 212 Concho Street, around the corner from Madame Porter's. On the 1900 census, Bishop's occupation was given as "unemployed music teacher". Born in West Virginia in September 1876, she was 23 at the time. The Ethel Bishop hypothesis combines the claim that she was a schoolteacher with the one that she was a prostitute.

Ann Bassett
Another conjecture is that she was a cattle rustler named Ann Bassett (1878–1956), who knew and ran with the Wild Bunch at the turn of the 20th century. Both Bassett and Place were attractive women, with similar facial features, body frame, and hair color. Bassett was born in 1878, the same year Place was thought to have been born. Dr. Thomas G. Kyle of the Computer Research Group at Los Alamos National Laboratory, who performed many photographic comparisons for government intelligence agencies, conducted a series of tests on photographs of Etta Place and Ann Bassett. Both had the same scar or cowlick at the top of their forehead. Dr. Kyle concluded that there could be no reasonable doubt they were the same person. Historian Doris Karren Burton also investigated the lives of both women and published a book in 1992 claiming they were one and the same.

However, Bassett and Place's chronologies do not align. Several documents prove that Bassett was in Wyoming during much of the time when Place was in South America. Bassett was arrested and briefly incarcerated in Utah for rustling cattle in 1903, while Place was in South America with Longabaugh and Parker. Bassett also married her first husband in Utah that year, so could not have been in South America during that time.

Eunice Gray
A once-popular theory held that she was Eunice Gray, who for many years operated a brothel in Fort Worth,  and later ran the Waco Hotel there until she died in a fire in January 1962. Gray once told Delbert Willis of the Fort Worth Press, "I've lived in Fort Worth since 1901. That is except for the time I had to high-tail it out of town. Went to South America for a few years ... until things settled down." Willis conceded that Gray never claimed to be Etta Place; he merely made that connection on his own, given the similarities in their ages, and the period in which Gray said she was in South America coinciding with Place's time there. Gray was described as a beautiful woman, and Willis believed that Place and Gray held a striking resemblance to one another, but no photographs of Gray from that period are available to compare with Place's.  In 2007, amateur genealogist Donna Donnell found Eunice Gray on a 1911 passenger list from Panama. Following that lead, she tracked down Gray's niece, who had two photographs of her; one was taken at her high-school graduation circa 1896, and another from sometime in the 1920s. Comparing those photos to Place's, both agreed that Eunice Gray was definitely not Etta Place.

Life after Longabaugh
Considerable debate still remains over when Place's relationship with Longabaugh ended. Some claims indicate that Place ended her relationship with Longabaugh and returned to the United States before his death. Others believe that the two remained romantically involved, and that she simply tired of life in South America. By 1907, she was known to have been living in San Francisco, but after that, she vanished without a trace.

In 1909, a woman matching Place's description asked Frank Aller (US vice consul in Antofagasta, Chile) for assistance in obtaining a death certificate for Longabaugh. No such certificate was issued, and the woman's identity was never ascertained.

Author Richard Llewellyn claimed that while in Argentina, he found indications that Place had moved to Paraguay following the death of Longabaugh, and that she had married a wealthy man. Also, rumors arose that Etta Place was in fact Edith Mae, wife of famous boxing promoter Tex Rickard, who retired to a ranch in Paraguay shortly after promoting the famous fight between Jack Johnson and Jim Jeffries in 1910.

A Pinkerton report states that a woman matching Place's description was killed in a shootout resulting from a domestic dispute with a man named Mateo Gebhart in Chubut, Argentina, in March 1922. Another report claims she committed suicide in 1924 in Argentina, and yet another states that she died of natural causes in 1966.

Various additional claims have been made about her life after the death of Longabaugh. Some believe that she returned to New York City, while other theories suggest she moved back to Texas and started a new life there. One claim is that she returned to her life as a schoolteacher, living the remainder of her life in Denver, Colorado, and another story says she lived the remainder of her life teaching in Marion, Oregon. Also various claims contend that she returned to prostitution, living the remainder of her life in Texas, California, or New York, but these claims are mere speculation, without any supporting evidence.

Researcher Larry Pointer, author of the 1977 book In Search of Butch Cassidy, wrote that Place's identity and fate are "one of the most intriguing riddles in western history. Leads develop only to dissolve into ambiguity."

Fact timelines generally accepted by historians
 1899–1900: Place was living in Texas and being courted by Harry A. Longabaugh, also known as the Sundance Kid. Some stories claim Place was a housekeeper or possibly a prostitute in Fannie Porter's sporting house during this time.
 December 1900: Place and Longabaugh reportedly marry, he using the alias Harry A. Place, shortly after he is photographed in the famous Fort Worth Five photo. No record of the marriage is known to exist.
 January 1901: Longabaugh and Place visit his family in Mont Clare, Pennsylvania.
 February 1901: Longabaugh and Place visit New York City and Tiffany's Jewelers.
 February 20, 1901: Longabaugh and Place board the RMS Herminius bound for Buenos Aires.
 March 3, 1902: Longabaugh and Place sail on the ship S.S. Soldier Prince from Argentina to New York City. Pinkerton detectives find evidence that Place was homesick and wanting to visit her family, but were unable to identify who her family was.
 April 2, 1902: Longabaugh and Place register at Mrs. Thompson's Boarding House in New York City, and visit members of his family in Atlantic City, New Jersey, then visit Coney Island.
 July 10, 1902: Place and Longabaugh pose as stewards and sail on the steamer Honorius back to Argentina.
 August 9, 1902: Place registers them at the Hotel Europa in Buenos Aires.
 Early to late 1903: Parker's former lover Ann Bassett marries a rancher by the name of Henry Bernard, and shortly thereafter is arrested for rustling.
 Summer 1904: Place and Longabaugh sail again to New York City to visit her family. Once again Pinkerton detectives discover she is homesick, but cannot discover the identity of her family.
 May 1, 1905: Place, Longabaugh, and Parker decide to sell their ranch in Cholila, Argentina, and leave South America to avoid the law there. Longabaugh and Place sail to San Francisco, where she remains, and he returns to South America.
 1907: Place is living alone in San Francisco, and there is no evidence she has seen Longabaugh since his departure two years prior.
 July 31, 1909: A woman matching Place's description attempts to obtain a death certificate following Longabaugh's death in Bolivia so that she can settle his estate. She disappears from all historical records after that. With Longabaugh dead, Pinkerton's interest in her location wanes, and her trail goes cold.

Media depictions
 In the 1969 film Butch Cassidy and the Sundance Kid, Etta Place is depicted as a schoolteacher. Screenwriter William Goldman was suspicious of claims that Place was a prostitute; he believed she was too attractive and vibrant to have worked as a prostitute, a profession that tended to age women prematurely and tax their health. Place was portrayed in the film by Katharine Ross.
 Elizabeth Montgomery portrayed Etta Place in Mrs. Sundance, a highly fictionalized 1974 television movie.
 Katharine Ross reprised her role as Etta Place in Wanted: The Sundance Woman, a fictionalized 1976 made-for-television movie.
 In the 1994 TV movie The Gambler V: Playing for Keeps, Etta Place is played by Mariska Hargitay.
 In the 2004 TV movie The Legend of Butch & Sundance, Rachelle Lefevre portrays Etta Place.
 Etta Place was played by Dominique McElligott in the 2011 film Blackthorn.
 Etta Place was the central character in Etta: A Novel by Gerald Kolpan, published in 2009 by Ballantine Books.

See also
 Outlaws
 American Old West

References

Further reading
 Answer Man: Mysterious Etta Place by Chuck Parsons

External links
 Etta Place at Sundance Kid and Henry Long

1870s births
American emigrants to Argentina
Butch Cassidy's Wild Bunch
People from Texas
Year of death unknown
Unidentified criminals
Unidentified American criminals